Mijailović is a Serbian surname, a patronymic derived from the masculine given name Mijailo.

Notable people with the name include:

Mijailo Mijailović (born 1978), self-confessed and convicted assassin of the Swedish Minister for Foreign Affairs Anna Lindh, stabbed in 2003
Nikola Mijailović (footballer) (born 1982), Serbian footballer
Nikola Mijailović (singer) (born 1973), Serbian baritone with international opera career since the mid-1990s
Nikola Mijailović (volleyball), Serbian volleyball player
Srđan Mijailović (born 1993), Serbian football player

See also
Mihailović

Serbian surnames
Patronymic surnames
Surnames from given names

ru:Мияилович